Pocho is an slang name for an American Mexican. It may also refer to:

 Pocho (crocodile), a crocodile 
 Pocho (novel), a novel by José Antonio Villarreal
 Pocho Aztlan, an album by Brujeria
 Pocho La Pantera, professional name for Ernesto Gauna
 Pocho volcanic field
 Pocho Department

See also
 Poncho (disambiguation)
 Poco (disambiguation)